Vinyl data is the use of vinyl discs to store sequenced/encoded data rather than for simple analog recordings. This alternate use of the storage medium enabled the code of full motion videos (FMVs) and even simple video games to be stored in an analog format along with the soundtrack and sound effects. These vinyl data discs took two forms: the FMV-only Capacitance Electronic Disc (CED), and the program sheet. Uncommon even in the early 1980s when the practice was at its height, program sheet game data required that users record from the disc (typically a flexi disc like the Interface Age "Floppy ROM") onto an audio cassette tape which could then be used via the cassette port with microcomputers such as the BBC Micro, Commodore 64, Commodore PET, VIC-20, Dragon 32/64, ZX81, or ZX Spectrum. The use of CEDs to store video game FMV data was even less common, and required the game console (typically an arcade machine) to select a section of the grooved track to read with its stylus at just the right time for the video to be displayed. The numerous limitations of these techniques (background noise, scratches, and other audio-fidelity problems)
 contributed to their failure to receive widespread acceptance and video game data stored in this manner remains some of the most difficult to archive and preserve.

List of vinyl-data releases

References 

 
Video game soundtracks